Mna is a village in the historical region of Khevi, north-eastern Georgia. It is located on the left bank of the Tergi tributary river – Mnaisistskali. Administratively, it is part of the Kazbegi Municipality in Mtskheta-Mtianeti. Distance to the municipality center Stepantsminda is 29 km.

Sources 
 Georgian Soviet Encyclopedia, V. 7, p. 52, Tbilisi, 1984 year.

References

Kobi Community villages